Masahiko Fujiwara (Japanese: 藤原 正彦 Fujiwara Masahiko; born July 9, 1943, in Shinkyo, Manchukuo) is a Japanese mathematician and writer who is known for his book The Dignity of the Nation. He is a professor emeritus at Ochanomizu University.

Biography
Masahiko Fujiwara is the son of Jirō Nitta and Tei Fujiwara, who were both popular authors. He graduated from the University of Tokyo in 1966.

He began writing after a two-year position as associate professor at the University of Colorado, with a book Wakaki sugakusha no Amerika 
designed to explain American campus life to Japanese people. He also wrote about the University of Cambridge, after a year's visit (Harukanaru Kenburijji: Ichi sugakusha no Igirisu). In a popular book on mathematics, he categorized theorems as beautiful theorems or ugly theorems. He is also known in Japan for speaking out against government reforms in secondary education. He wrote The Dignity of the Nation, which according to Time Asia was the second best selling book in the first six months of 2006 in Japan.

In 2006, Fujiwara published Yo ni mo utsukushii sugaku nyumon ("An Introduction to the World's Most Elegant Mathematics") with the writer Yōko Ogawa: it is a dialogue between novelist and mathematician on the extraordinary beauty of numbers.

References

External links
Article in the Financial Times from 2007.
Online essay
Essay on Literature and Mathematics

Japanese essayists
Mathematics popularizers
Number theorists
20th-century Japanese mathematicians
21st-century Japanese mathematicians
1943 births
Living people
Recreational mathematicians
Japanese people from Manchukuo
University of Tokyo alumni
University of Colorado Boulder faculty
20th-century essayists
21st-century essayists
Academic staff of Ochanomizu University